(14 January 1900 – 7 July 1959) was a left-wing Japanese film director and film critic. He was a founding member of the Proletarian Film League of Japan (Prokino), providing inspiration to the movement through his writings and his films.

Bibliography 
 Makino, Mamoru. "Rethinking the Emergence of the Proletarian Film League of Japan (Prokino)." In Praise of Film Studies: Essays in Honor of Makino Mamoru. Eds. Aaron Gerow and Abé Mark Nornes (Kinema Club, 2001).
 
 Prewar Proletarian Film Movements Collection. Center for Japanese Studies, University of Michigan. Full text of many Prokino publications, including some of Sasa's articles.

Japanese film critics
Japanese film directors
1900 births
1959 deaths